Emirate of Multan (855 – 1010) was a medieval kingdom in Punjab that was centred around city of Multan, present-day part of Punjab, Pakistan. It was initially ruled by the tribe of Banu Munabbih. In 959 CE, Ismaili Qarmatians under Banu Lawi gained control of the Emirate and in 1010, it was conquered by Ghaznavid Empire.

Location

The Emirate of Multan became independent after Disintegration of Abbasid Caliphate. Principally located in South Punjab, it bordered Hindu Shahi Kingdom at north in Punjab and Habbarid Emirate at south in Sindh.

History

Multan along with Sindh came under rule of Muslims by conquest of Umayyad Caliphate under General Muhammad Bin Qasim. Over the course of the mid-ninth century, Abbasid authority in Sind gradually waned. As the central government's authority over Sind declined, the region underwent a period of decentralization. Multan also became capital of an independent emirate under an Arab tribe Banu Munabbih.

Banu Munabbih (855–959 AD)
By the mid-800s, the Banu Munabbih (also known as the Banu Sama), who claimed descent from the Prophet Muhammad's Quraysh tribe came to rule Multan, and established the Emirate, which ruled for the next century. At the opening of 10th century, Ibn Rusta was first to report a well established Emirate in Multan. Muhammad III, whose full name was Muhammad bin al-Qasim bin Munabbih, was reported by  Al-Biruni to be the first of the Banu Munabbih (Samid) rulers of Multan - he conquered Multan and issued silver dammas bearing his Hindu epithet "Mihiradeva" ("Sun god") on the reverse.

During this era, the Multan Sun Temple was noted by the 10th century Arab geographer Al-Muqaddasi to have been located in a most populous part of the city. The Hindu temple was noted to have accrued the Muslim rulers large tax revenues, by some accounts up to 30% of the state's revenues. During this time, the city's Arabic nickname was Faraj Bayt al-Dhahab, ("Frontier House of Gold"), reflecting the importance of the temple to the city's economy.

Interregnum by Jalam bin Shayban (959 – 985 AD)

By the mid 10th century, Multan had come under the influence of the Qarmatians. The Qarmatians had been expelled from Egypt and Iraq following their defeat at the hands of the Abbasids there. They wrested control of the city from the pro-Abbasid Amirate of Banu Munabbih, and pledged allegiance to the Fatimid Caliphate based in  Cairo instead of Abbasid Caliphate at Baghdad. 

Jalam bin Shayban, a proselytizing Da'i that had been dispatched to the region by the Fatimid Caliph Imam al-Mu'izz, was dispatched to replace the city's previous Da'i who had been accused of promoting a syncretic version of Islam that incorporated Hindu rites – though his replacement was likely the result of doctrinal differences regarding succession in the Ismaili Imamate. It was during the later part of his rule, that the Multan Sun Temple was destroyed (alongside another long-established Sunni Jama Mosque) and a new mosque erected at the site.

Banu Lawi (985 – 1010 AD)

Hamid Khan Lodi (985 – 997)
During the reign of Hamid Khan Lodi, the Ghaznawid Amir Sabuktagin invaded Multan in 381/991 during his era, but later made a truce with Hamid Lodi, as Isma'ili Multan served as a buffer-state between the rising Turkish power of Ghazna and the old Hindu rulers-the Imperial Pratiharas of Kanauj.

Fateh Daud (997 – 1010)

Abul Fateh Daud was the grandson and successor of Hamid Lodi. During his reign, Multan was attacked by the Ghaznavids, destabilizing the Ismaili state. Mahmud of Ghazna invaded Multan in 1005, conducting a series of campaigns during which some Ismailis were massacred while most later converted to Sunni Hanafi fiqh. The city was surrendered, and Abdul Fateh Daud was permitted to retain control over the city with the condition that he adhere to the Sunni interpretation of Islam. Mahmud appointed a Hindu-convert, Nawasa Khan, to rule the region in Mahmud's absentia. After being granted power, Niwasa Khan renounced Islam, and attempted to secure control of the region in collusion with Abdul Fateh Daud. Mahmud of Ghazni then led another expedition to Multan in 1007 C.E. against Niwasa Khan, who was then captured and forced to relinquish his personal fortune to Ghazni.

Fateh Daud was then deposed by Mahmud of Ghazni, who also massacred the Ismailis in the course of his conquest of Multan. He fled to a fort where he immured himself and was finally pardoned by Mahmud of Ghazni on the promise of payment of ransom. Abul Fatah Daud offered a yearly tribute of 200,000 golden dirhams and conversion from Shia Ismaili fiqh to Sunni Hanafi fiqh. The terms were accepted, and Sultan Mahmud Ghaznavi also exacted two million dirhams from the population of Multan by force. After death of Fateh Daud, the Emirate was abolished and annexed into Ghaznavid Empire.

Culture and Society

The economy of Multan at that time period seems to be rather vibrant. The 10th century Arab historian Al-Masudi noted Multan as the city where Central Asian caravans from Islamic Khorasan would assemble. The 10th century Persian geographer Estakhri noted that the city of Multan was approximately half the size of Sindh's Mansura, which along with Multan were the only two Arab principalities in South Asia. 

Arabic was spoken in both cities, though the inhabitants of Multan were reported by Estakhri to also have been speakers of Persian, reflecting the importance of trade with Khorasan. Polyglossia rendered Multani merchants culturally well-suited for trade with the Islamic world. The 10th century Hudud al-'Alam notes that Multan's rulers were also in control of Lahore, though that city was then lost to the Hindu Shahi Empire. During the 10th century, Multan's rulers resided at a camp outside of the city named Jandrawār, and would enter Multan once a week on the back of an elephant for Friday prayers.

During reign of Jalam Bin Shayban, Multan continued to be a prosperous city, as witness by famous geographer and traveller Al-Muqadassi in 985;

See also
Sultanate of Multan
History of Punjab

Notes

References

History of Pakistan
Former emirates